The West Indies national cricket team toured Pakistan from 27 November to 6 December 1985 and played a five-match One Day International series against Pakistan. West Indies won the series 3–2.

One Day Internationals (ODIs)

West Indies won the Wills Series 3-2.

1st ODI

2nd ODI

3rd ODI

4th ODI

5th ODI

References

External links
 Tour home at ESPNCricinfo
 Cricket Archive tournament page
 
 

1986 in Pakistani cricket
1986 in West Indian cricket
1985-86
International cricket competitions from 1985–86 to 1988
Pakistani cricket seasons from 1970–71 to 1999–2000